Acellomyia is a genus of horse flies in the family Tabanidae.

Species
Acellomyia casablanca González, 2017
Acellomyia fontanensis (Coscarón, 1962)
Acellomyia mapuche (Coscarón & Philip, 1967)
Acellomyia paulseni (Philippi, 1865)
Acellomyia puyehue González, 2017

References

Tabanidae
Diptera of South America
Brachycera genera